Freeplane is a free, open source software application for creating mind maps  (diagrams of connections between ideas), and electronic outlines. Written in Java, it is supported on Windows, Mac OS X and Linux, and is licensed under the GNU GPL version "2 or later".

In 2007, Freeplane was forked from the FreeMind project. Freeplane maintains partial file format compatibility with FreeMind, fully supporting the FreeMind XML file format, but adds features and tags not supported by FreeMind, which FreeMind ignores on loading.

Features

Release 1.1 
New features of Freeplane stable release (June 2010) include:

 Export to PNG, JPEG, SVG (in addition to HTML / XHTML and PDF)
 Find / Replace in all open maps
 Paste HTML as node structure
 Outline mode
 Portable version (run from a USB flash drive)
 Scripting via Groovy
 Spell checker

Release 1.2.x 
The first stable Freeplane 1.2.x was 1.2.20 released on October 20, 2012. It includes the following new features:

 Text processor like node styles
 Conditional node styles
 Map templates for new maps
 Formatting panel
 Add-ons: Installable enhancements
 Hyperlinks for menu items
 Keyboard shortcut documentation: Map and HTML table generation added for the documentation map
 Check for newer auto save files on opening of a map
 Single instance mode: open files in existing program instance instead of opening a new one.
 Node level dependent filters
 Improvement in search and replace functions
 Different cloud shapes
 New icons for rating 
 Automatic Edge Color  
 "Grid" for moving of nodes (Preferences->Behaviour->Grid gap size) 
 Copy and paste attributes 
 Named filter conditions 
 Different shapes, line types, width and transparency for connectors
 Freeplane portable version (download and install file named FreeplanePortable_xxx.paf.exe)
 File -> Properties... dialog showing facts about the map such as total nodes, branches and leaf nodes
 New icons added to facilitate speedy use of main and contextual menus
 Formulas: Use of formulas as node text and attributes (like in spread sheet processors)
 Node numbering and Formats/templates as style attributes
 Added progress icons to show incremental completion in 10% or 25% steps
 Summaries: Create graphical and textual summaries by "bracketing" nodes. See example map
 Menu and command structure refactored both to integrate new features and to make Freeplane more intuitive and easier to learn
 Dates and numbers: Parsing and formatting improved
 Digital post-its: free positionable and free floating nodes.
 Dates and numbers: Improved scripting support

Release 1.3.x 
Version 1.3 was published ((date)). 
New features of 1.3.x included:

 Expand LaTeX feature to both formulae and text
 Integration of OpenStreetMap

Release 1.5.x 
New features of Freeplane 1.5 include:

 New options for creating mind maps with high homogeneity and symmetry
 Clones
 Init scripts
 Background images

Release 1.6.x 
 References to other mind maps from formulas and scripts
 PDF and SVG exports enhancements
 Java 9 support
 JLatexMath update
 Bug fixes

Release 1.7.x 
 Dark UI mode support (Look and feel and map template "Darcula")
 User interface enhancements
 Nodes and aliases enhancements
 Java 13 support, Java 11 compatibility, Java 7 support dropped, Java 8 is required
 Bug fixes

Release 1.10.x 

Add-ons 

One feature of Freeplane is the support for installable enhancements. Add-ons are a way to extend and customize Freeplane similar to how plug-ins and extensions can be used to extend and customize well-known applications like Firefox or LibreOffice. Freeplane add-ons can be used to provide a single function, a bundle of multiple functions, bind those functions to a menu item, etc.

Available add-ons include :
 GTD support 
 study planner
 more icons
 versioning and collaborative work 

See more on the add-ons page.

See also 

 Mind map
 List of mind mapping software

References

External links
 
 
  FreeMind By Example covers usage of FreeMind and Freeplane 

Concept mapping software
Mind-mapping software
Concept- and mind-mapping software programmed in Java
Note-taking software
Free note-taking software
Free software programmed in Java (programming language)
Software forks